Paula Dacia DeAnda (born November 3, 1989) is an American singer and songwriter. She first came to prominence with her first single, "Doing Too Much", which became a hit in the Southwest. She then got the opportunity to audition for Clive Davis, who signed her to Arista Records on the spot. Her debut album, Paula DeAnda, was released in 2006 and contained the US Billboard Hot 100 top twenty song "Walk Away (Remember Me)".

Early life
DeAnda was born in San Angelo, Texas, to Mexican-American parents Steven and Barbara Dienda, a restaurant general manager and a registered nurse, respectively. At age six she began taking piano lessons and was soon singing at functions around town at the recommendation of her piano teacher. She also sang the national anthem at local football games. In 2002, DeAnda's family decided to move to Corpus Christi in order to help advance her career in music since Corpus Christi had a reputation as a music hub. She attended Mary Carroll High School.

Career

2005–09: Debut album Paula DeAnda

DeAnda was the opening act for a concert which featured hip-hop artists, Nelly, Baby Bash and Frankie J. performing in front of twenty thousand people. Her first single, "What Would It Take" was serviced to local radio stations in July, received airplay from ten radio stations across the country. Her next single "Doing Too Much" was released in December. It was then that she got the opportunity to audition for Clive Davis who signed her for a seven-album deal with Arista Records on the spot.

"Doing Too Much" served as the lead single to her self-titled debut album which was released in the summer of 2006, and charted in the Top50 of the Billboard Hot 100. It was later was certified gold in the US in 2007. Paula DeAnda charted at #54 on the Billboard 200 chart. The album mainly consists of songs about love and relationships and is of the pop-R&B genre. DeAnda co-wrote four songs on the album, which features production from Happy Perez among others. She was only 16 years old at the time of the album's release. Her second single "Walk Away (Remember Me)" (written by Christina Milian and Ne-Yo) was her biggest hit, reaching the top twenty on the Hot 100. The single was certified gold by the RIAA, becoming her second single to do so. Follow-up singles from her debut included "When It Was Me" and "Easy" which the latter featured rapper Lil Wayne. She later appeared in the MTV television film Super Sweet 16: The Movie.

In 2008, DeAnda began production on next effort, initially due in 2009. A buzz single "Stunned Out" was released and garnered some airplay, but the set's lead single ended up being the ballad "Roll the Credits", which was released with a music video was planned. Clive Davis left Arista's parent company at the time, RCA Label Group in 2008 to become the chief creative officer for Sony BMG. DeAnda also parted ways Arista following his departure.

2010–14: Scrapped second album, The Voice and The Voice & the Beats EP
After leaving Arista Records, DeAnda's sophomore album was shelved, in addition to a tentative Spanish album. However her Spanish album was leaked to Yahoo Musica, a Latin Music venue that featured her leaked singles from the sophomore album. Following this period, DeAnda began posting a series of covers on YouTube in the summer of 2010. DeAnda released a series of digital singles: "Besos" in 2011 which would later be covered by Jojo, "Your Place" in 2012 and "Shut Up and Love Me" in 2013.

Following her digital releases in 2013, DeAnda was selected to perform the National Anthem live on television at the Canelo vs Trout fight.

Later in 2014, DeAnda auditioned for Season 6 of NBC's singing competition, The Voice, as revealed on her Twitter page. Both Shakira and Blake Shelton turned their chairs but she opted for Blake Shelton. During the Battles, Round 1, she was defeated by fellow Team Blake teammate Sisaundra Lewis after their duet of Lady Gaga's "Do What U Want".

 – Studio version of performance reached the top 10 on iTunes

After The Voice, DeAnda collaborated with the Jump Smokers on her first EP The Voice & The Beats, which was released on June 25, 2014, and featured the first single "Horns Blow (Shimmy Shimmy)".

2015–2019: Second EP PDA, Collaborations, etc.
In February 2015, DeAnda launched a Kickstarter campaign to help fund a new album, which was achieved in a couple of weeks. In May, she announced an EP titled PDA.  The project was to be preceded by the song, "Brand New", released on March 23, 2015.

In early 2018 DeAnda was asked to sing the Star Spangled Banner once more for the televised rematch fight Canelo Álvarez vs. Gennady Golovkin II.  In April 2019, DeAnda featured on a single titled "Killin' My Vibe" by Waseem Shark and Dub Shakes, which featured her vocals in Hindi and garnered airplay success in Southeast Asia.

By October 3, 2019, DeAnda released Iddi Biddi, which paid homage to Selena and Aaliyah. The song was later followed by lyric visuals and is set to promote the revival of her PDA project. Since December 2019, Paula has been hinting for a possible musical collaboration between her and Nivea. Both singers have shown interest in working together.

Influences
DeAnda has cited Christina Aguilera, Jo Dee Messina, Shania Twain, Aaliyah, LeAnn Rimes, and Selena as major musical influences.

Discography

Studio albums

Extended plays

Singles

Notes
A  "When It Was Me" did not enter the Billboard Hot 100, but peaked at number 13 on the Bubbling Under Hot 100 Singles chart.

Music videos

Other appearances

Filmography

Film
Year | Film | Role

2007 | Super Sweet 16: The Movie | Alicia

2008 | Paula DeAnda (Video-EPK) | Herself

2012 | Barbie in a Mermaid Tale 2 | Soundtrack only

References

External links 
 

1989 births
Living people
American musicians of Mexican descent
American women pop singers
J Records artists
Singers from Texas
People from Corpus Christi, Texas
People from San Angelo, Texas
Hispanic and Latino American women singers
Hispanic and Latino American musicians
Arista Records artists
21st-century American women singers
21st-century American singers
The Voice (franchise) contestants